Paulose II may refer to:

 Athanasius Paulose II (1915–1991), First Metropolitan of Evangelistic Association of the East consecrated as Metropolitan in 1973
 Baselios Paulose II, Catholicos of the Jacobite Syrian Christian Church in 1975–2002
 Paulose II (Indian Orthodox Church), Catholicos of the East and Supreme Head of the Indian Orthodox Church since 2010 until his death in 2021.